Rio Verde (Portuguese for "green river") is a tributary of the Guaporé River in Rondônia state, western Brazil.

See also
List of rivers of Rondônia

References
Brazilian Ministry of Transport

Rivers of Rondônia